The  was an unsuccessful and unsolicited attempt by Mitsubishi to meet a 1934 requirement issued by the Japanese Army for a modern single-seat monoplane fighter suitable to the needs of the Imperial Japanese Army Air Force. During this competition, Nakajima entered the Nakajima Ki-11 (which was somewhat similar to the Boeing P-26 Peashooter), and Kawasaki entered the more maneuverable Kawasaki Ki-10 biplane. The competition was won by Kawasaki, but the new fighter was not accepted by the IJAAF with much enthusiasm.

Design and development
In 1934, Mitsubishi had developed the Ka-14 9-Shi fighter prototype specifically for an Imperial Japanese Navy requirement. The design exhibited outstanding performance, and with the Navy's consent, the Army placed a contract with Mitsubishi for a modified version for evaluation, which was designated the Ki-18.

The Ki-18 was a low-wing monoplane of all-metal construction with fabric-covered control surfaces.

The main external differences between the Ki-18 and the Ka-14 included an enlarged rudder, larger landing gear (with spats) and an engine cowling. Internally, the direction of the throttle movement was reversed to meet Army practice, and the machine guns were replaced with Army standard weaponry.

The Ki-18 made its first flight once completed in August 1935 at the Army's Tachikawa Air Technical Research Institute, and was later tested at the Akeno Army Flying School through the end of 1935.

The Akeno Army Flying School test results gave the Ki-18 a very high recommendation, and it was proposed that the fighter be produced for front-line service. However, the Army Air Technical Research Institute was vehemently against using a Navy design, and after choosing to ignore the data, claimed that the Nakajima Kotobuki engines were "unreliable" and that the Ki-18 lacked the performance necessary for an Army fighter. Instead, the Army Air Technical Research Institute recommended that a new competition would be staged, with Nakajima, Kawasaki and Mitsubishi invited to participate. As the Ki-10 had entered production only one year earlier, this proposal was immediately vetoed by the Imperial Japanese Army General Staff. Thus, the Ki-18 ended with only one aircraft, although the essentially identical Ka-14 was accepted as a revolutionary fighter by the Japanese Navy as the Mitsubishi A5M Type 96 carrier-based fighter.

Variants
 Ki-18 : Prototype for testing (1 unit produced)

Operators

 Imperial Japanese Army Air Force

Specifications (Ki-18)

See also

References
Notes

Bibliography

 Francillon, Ph.D., René J. Japanese Aircraft of the Pacific War. London: Putnam & Company Ltd., 1970 (second edition 1979). .
 Januszewski, Tadeusz. Mitsubishi A5M Claude. Sandomierz, Poland/Redbourn, UK: Mushroom Model Publications, 2003. .
 Mikesh, Robert C. and Shorzoe Abe. Japanese Aircraft, 1910-1941. Annapolis, MD: Naval Institute Press, 1990. .
 Unknown author. Famous Airplanes of the World, first series, #76: Army Experimental Fighters (1). Tokyo: Bunrin-Do, August 1976.
 Unknown author. Famous Airplanes of the World, second series, #24: Army Experimental Fighters. Tokyo: Bunrin-Do, September 1990.

External links

 Axis History Forum

Low-wing aircraft
Ki-18, Mitsubishi
1930s Japanese experimental aircraft
Ki-018
Single-engined tractor aircraft